Arantxa Sánchez Vicario and Larisa Savchenko were the defending champions and won in the final 7–5, 4–6, 7–5 against Mariaan de Swardt and Iva Majoli.

Seeds
Champion seeds are indicated in bold text while text in italics indicates the round in which those seeds were eliminated.

 Arantxa Sánchez Vicario /  Larisa Savchenko (champions)
 Julie Halard /  Nathalie Tauziat (quarterfinals)
 Amanda Coetzer /  Inés Gorrochategui (quarterfinals)
 Patricia Tarabini /  Caroline Vis (semifinals)

Draw

External links
 1995 Ford International Championships of Spain Doubles Draw

Doubles